Northern Lights Secondary School is a public high school in Moosonee, Ontario, Canada.

The school is notable for being the first in the district to launch the PO (Personal Organisation) programme in 2019.

References

Educational institutions established in 1930
High schools in Ontario
1930 establishments in Ontario